This is a list of species in Tachysphex, a genus of square-headed wasps in the family Crabronidae.

Tachysphex species

 Tachysphex aborigenus Pulawski, 1977 i c g
 Tachysphex aburi Pulawski, 2007 i c g
 Tachysphex acanthophorus Pulawski, 1982 i c g
 Tachysphex actites Pulawski in Krombein and Pulawski, 1994 i c g
 Tachysphex acutemarginatus Strand, 1910 i c g
 Tachysphex acutus (Patton, 1880) i c g
 Tachysphex adjunctus Kohl, 1885 i c g
 Tachysphex advenus Pulawski, 1974 i c g
 Tachysphex aemulus Kohl, 1906 i c g
 Tachysphex aequalis W. Fox, 1894 i c g
 Tachysphex aethiopicus Arnold, 1923 i c g
 Tachysphex aethiops (Cresson, 1865) i c g
 Tachysphex agilis (F. Smith, 1856) i c g
 Tachysphex agnus Pulawski, 1971 i c g
 Tachysphex alayoi Pulawski, 1974 i c g
 Tachysphex albocinctus (Lucas, 1849) i c g
 Tachysphex alpestris Rohwer, 1908 i c g
 Tachysphex ambiguus Arnold, 1923 i c g
 Tachysphex ambositrae Leclercq, 1967 i c g
 Tachysphex ampijoroa Pulawski, 2007 i c g
 Tachysphex amplus W. Fox, 1894 i c g
 Tachysphex anceps Arnold, 1945 i c g
 Tachysphex angelicus Pulawski, 1988 i c g
 Tachysphex angustatus Pulawski, 1967 i c g
 Tachysphex angustus Arnold, 1924 i c g
 Tachysphex antennatus W. Fox, 1894 i c g
 Tachysphex anthracinus Pulawski in Krombein and Pulawski, 1994 i c g
 Tachysphex antillarum Pulawski, 1974 i c g
 Tachysphex anubis Pulawski, 1964 i c g
 Tachysphex apakensis Tsuneki, 1971 i c g
 Tachysphex apicalis W. Fox, 1893 i c g
 Tachysphex apoctenus Pulawski, 1974 i c g
 Tachysphex apricus Pulawski, 1982 i c g
 Tachysphex araucanus Pulawski, 1974 i c g
 Tachysphex argentatus Gussakovskij, 1952 i c g
 Tachysphex argenticeps Arnold, 1959 i c g
 Tachysphex argentifrons Arnold, 1924 i c g
 Tachysphex arizonac Pulawski, 1982 i c g
 Tachysphex armatus Pulawski, 1982 i c g
 Tachysphex ashmeadii W. Fox, 1894 i c g
 Tachysphex asinus Arnold, 1923 i c g
 Tachysphex asmara Pulawski, 2007 i c g
 Tachysphex aterrimus Arnold, 1924 i c g
 Tachysphex atlanteus de Beaumont, 1955 i c g
 Tachysphex atratus (Lepeletier de Saint Fargeau, 1845) i c g
 Tachysphex aureopilosus Tsuneki, 1972 i c g
 Tachysphex aureorufoniger Pulawski, 2007 i c g
 Tachysphex auriceps Cameron, 1889 i c g
 Tachysphex auropilosus R. Turner, 1917 i c g
 Tachysphex austriacus Kohl, 1892 i c g
 Tachysphex bara Pulawski, 2007 i c g
 Tachysphex barkeri Arnold, 1923 i c g
 Tachysphex beaumonti Pulawski, 1971 i c g
 Tachysphex beidzimiao Tsuneki, 1971 i c g
 Tachysphex belfragei (Cresson, 1873) i c g
 Tachysphex bemba Pulawski, 2007 i c g
 Tachysphex bengalensis Cameron, 1889 i c
 Tachysphex bipustulosus Arnold, 1949 i c g
 Tachysphex bituberculatus Cameron, 1905 i c g
 Tachysphex blattivorus Gussakovskij, 1952 i c g
 Tachysphex bohartorum Pulawski, 1982 i c g
 Tachysphex bohemicus Straka, 2016 g
 Tachysphex bostryx Pulawski, 2007 i c g
 Tachysphex bouceki Straka, 2005 i c g
 Tachysphex brachypus Pulawski, 2007 i c g
 Tachysphex brasilianus Pulawski, 1974 i c g
 Tachysphex braunsi Arnold, 1923 i c g
 Tachysphex breviceps Pulawski, 1974 i c g
 Tachysphex brevicornis Pulawski, 1977 i c g
 Tachysphex brevipecten de Beaumont, 1955 i c g
 Tachysphex brevipennis Mercet, 1909 i c g
 Tachysphex brevipes Pulawski, 1971 i c g
 Tachysphex brinckerae R. Turner, 1917 i c g
 Tachysphex brullii (F. Smith, 1856) i c g
 Tachysphex bruneiceps Arnold, 1923 i c g
 Tachysphex buccalis Pulawski, 1977 i c g
 Tachysphex buyssoni Morice, 1897 i c g
 Tachysphex caliban Arnold, 1923 i c
 Tachysphex calidus Pulawski, 2007 i c g
 Tachysphex camptopygus Pulawski, 2007 i c g
 Tachysphex capensis (de Saussure, 1867) i c g
 Tachysphex carinatus Pulawski, 2007 i c g
 Tachysphex carli de Beaumont, 1947 i c g
 Tachysphex cavatus Pulawski, 2007 i c g
 Tachysphex changi Tsuneki, 1967 i c g
 Tachysphex cheops de Beaumont, 1940 i c g
 Tachysphex chephren de Beaumont, 1940 i c g
 Tachysphex chiastotrichus Pulawski in Krombein and Pulawski, 1994 i c g
 Tachysphex circulans Pulawski, 1977 i c g
 Tachysphex clarconis Viereck, 1906 i c g
 Tachysphex claripes Arnold, 1924 i c g
 Tachysphex clypeatus Arnold, 1947 i c g
 Tachysphex clypedentalis T. Li, Cai and Q. Li, 2008 i c g
 Tachysphex cockerellae Rohwer, 1914 i c g
 Tachysphex cocopa Pulawski, 1988 i c g
 Tachysphex conceptus Pulawski, 1974 i c g
 Tachysphex conclusus Nurse, 1903 i c g
 Tachysphex confrater Pulawski, 1971 i c g
 Tachysphex congoensis Arnold, 1924 i c g
 Tachysphex consocius Kohl, 1892 i c g
 Tachysphex contrarius Pulawski, 1977 i c g
 Tachysphex coquilletti Rohwer, 1911 i c g
 Tachysphex coriaceus (A. Costa, 1867) i c g
 Tachysphex costae (De Stefani Perez, 1882) i c g
 Tachysphex coxalis Pulawski, 2007 i c g
 Tachysphex crassiformis Viereck, 1906 i c g
 Tachysphex crassipes Arnold, 1923 i c g
 Tachysphex crenulatus W. Fox, 1894 i c g
 Tachysphex cretensis Straka, 2016 g
 Tachysphex crinitus Pulawski in Krombein and Pulawski, 1994 i c g
 Tachysphex crocodilus Pulawski, 1971 i c g
 Tachysphex ctenophorus Pulawski, 1971 i c g
 Tachysphex cubanus Pulawski, 1974 i c g
 Tachysphex curvipes Pulawski, 2007 i c g
 Tachysphex denisi de Beaumont, 1936 i c g
 Tachysphex depressiventris R. Turner, 1916 i c g
 Tachysphex descendentis Mercet, 1909 i c g
 Tachysphex deserticola de Beaumont, 1940 i c g
 Tachysphex desertorum F. Morawitz, 1894 i c g
 Tachysphex detritus Arnold, 1924 i c g
 Tachysphex diabolicus Arnold, 1923 i c g
 Tachysphex diadelus Pulawski in Krombein and Pulawski, 1994 i c g
 Tachysphex dignus Kohl in Kohl and Handlirsch, 1889 i c g
 Tachysphex dimidiatus Panzer, 1809 g
 Tachysphex discrepans R. Turner, 1915 i c g
 Tachysphex dissimulatus Pulawski, 2007 i c g
 Tachysphex diversilabris Arnold, 1960 i c g
 Tachysphex dolosus Arnold, 1923 i c g
 Tachysphex dominicanus Pulawski, 1988 i c g
 Tachysphex drymobius Pulawski in Krombein and Pulawski, 1994 i c g
 Tachysphex dzinghis Tsuneki, 1972 i c g
 Tachysphex ebeninus Arnold, 1929 i c g
 Tachysphex eldoradensis Rohwer, 1917 i c g
 Tachysphex erectus Pulawski, 2007 i c g
 Tachysphex erythrophorus Dalla Torre, 1897 i c g
 Tachysphex erythropus (Spinola, 1839) i c g
 Tachysphex erythrurus Pulawski, 2007 i c g
 Tachysphex eucalypticus Pulawski, 1977 i c g
 Tachysphex eucharistus Pulawski in Krombein and Pulawski, 1994 i c g
 Tachysphex eurystoma Pulawski, 2007 i c g
 Tachysphex euxinus Pulawski, 1958 i c g
 Tachysphex excavatus Pulawski, 2007 i c g
 Tachysphex excelsus R. Turner, 1917 i c g
 Tachysphex excisus Arnold, 1945 i c g
 Tachysphex eximius Pulawski, 1971 i c g
 Tachysphex fanuiensis Cheesman, 1928 i c g
 Tachysphex fasciatus Morice, 1897 i c
 Tachysphex ferrugineus Pulawski, 1971 i c g
 Tachysphex flavofimbriatus Arnold, 1945 i c g
 Tachysphex foliaceus Pulawski, 1977 i c g
 Tachysphex formosanus Tsuneki, 1971 i c g
 Tachysphex fortior R. Turner, 1908 i c g
 Tachysphex frigidus Pulawski, 2007 i c g
 Tachysphex fugax (Radoszkowski, 1877) i c g
 Tachysphex fulgidus Arnold, 1924 i c g
 Tachysphex fulviantennatus Tsuneki, 1976 i c g
 Tachysphex fulvitarsis (A. Costa, 1867) i c g
 Tachysphex fuscispina Pulawski, 1971 i c g
 Tachysphex gagates Arnold, 1940 i c g
 Tachysphex galapagensis Rohwer, 1924 i c g
 Tachysphex galeatus Pulawski, 1977 i c g
 Tachysphex gastrotrichus Pulawski, 2007 i c g
 Tachysphex gegen Tsuneki, 1971 i c g
 Tachysphex geniculatus (Spinola, 1839) i c g
 Tachysphex georgii Arnold, 1940 i c g
 Tachysphex gessianus Pulawski, 2007 i c g
 Tachysphex glaber Kohl, 1906 i c g
 Tachysphex glabrior F. Williams, 1914 i c g
 Tachysphex gracilicornis Mercet, 1909 i c g
 Tachysphex gracilitarsis Morice in E. Saunders, 1910 i c g
 Tachysphex graecus Kohl, 1883 i c g
 Tachysphex grandissimus Gussakovskij, 1933 i c g
 Tachysphex gryllivorus Pulawski in Krombein and Pulawski, 1994 i c g
 Tachysphex gujaraticus Nurse, 1909 i c g
 Tachysphex gussakovskii Pulawski, 1971 i c g
 Tachysphex hadronyx Pulawski, 2007 i c g
 Tachysphex haematopus Pulawski in Krombein and Pulawski, 1994 i c g
 Tachysphex harpax Arnold, 1923 i c g
 Tachysphex helveticus Kohl, 1885 i c g
 Tachysphex hermia Arnold, 1924 i c g
 Tachysphex hippolyta Arnold, 1924 i c g
 Tachysphex hopi Pulawski, 1988 i c g
 Tachysphex horus de Beaumont, 1940 i c g
 Tachysphex hostilis Kohl, 1901 i c g
 Tachysphex huchiti Pulawski, 1988 i c g
 Tachysphex humilis Straka, 2005 i c g
 Tachysphex hungaricus Straka, 2016 g
 Tachysphex hurdi R. Bohart, 1962 i c g
 Tachysphex hypoleius (F. Smith, 1856) i c g
 Tachysphex iaphetes Pulawski, 2007 i c g
 Tachysphex ibi Pulawski, 2007 i c g
 Tachysphex idiotrichus Pulawski, 1982 i c g
 Tachysphex idzekii Tsuneki, 1971 i c g
 Tachysphex imbellis R. Turner, 1908 i c g
 Tachysphex incanus de Beaumont, 1940 i c g
 Tachysphex incertus (Radoszkowski, 1877) i c g
 Tachysphex inconspicuus (W.F. Kirby, 1890) i c g
 Tachysphex indicus Pulawski in Krombein and Pulawski, 1994 i c g
 Tachysphex inextricabilis Pulawski, 1971 i c g
 Tachysphex instructus Nurse, 1909 i c g
 Tachysphex insulsus Arnold, 1945 i c g
 Tachysphex iridipennis (F. Smith, 1873) i c g
 Tachysphex irregularis Pulawski, 1982 i c g
 Tachysphex isis de Beaumont, 1940 i c g
 Tachysphex jokischianus (Panzer, 1809) g
 Tachysphex jujuyensis Brèthes, 1913 i c g
 Tachysphex julliani Kohl, 1883 i c g
 Tachysphex kalaharicus Arnold, 1924 i c g
 Tachysphex karasi Straka, 2005 i c g
 Tachysphex karoo Pulawski, 2007 i c g
 Tachysphex kaszabi Tsuneki, 1972 i c g
 Tachysphex khoikhoi Pulawski, 2007 i c g
 Tachysphex kodairai Tsuneki, 1971 i c g
 Tachysphex krombeini Kurczewski, 1971 i c g
 Tachysphex krombeiniellus Pulawski, 1982 i c g
 Tachysphex lacertosus Arnold, 1944 i c g
 Tachysphex laevifrons (F. Smith, 1856) i c g
 Tachysphex lagunaensis Tsuneki, 1983 i c g
 Tachysphex lamellatus Pulawski, 1982 i c g
 Tachysphex laticauda Gussakovskij, 1933 i c g
 Tachysphex latifrons Kohl, 1884 i c g
 Tachysphex limatus Arnold, 1924 i c g
 Tachysphex lindbergi de Beaumont, 1956 i c g
 Tachysphex linsleyi R. Bohart, 1962 i c g
 Tachysphex liriformis Pulawski, 1967 i c g
 Tachysphex longipalpis de Beaumont, 1940 i c g
 Tachysphex longipes Pulawski, 2007 i c g
 Tachysphex lucillus Pulawski, 1971 i c g
 Tachysphex luctuosus Arnold, 1924 i c g
 Tachysphex luxuriosus Morice, 1897 i c g
 Tachysphex mackayensis R. Turner, 1908 i c g
 Tachysphex maculipennis Pulawski, 1977 i c g
 Tachysphex magnaemontis Hensen in Hensen and Ooijen, 1987 i c g
 Tachysphex malkovskii Pulawski, 1971 i c g
 Tachysphex marshalli R. Turner, 1917 i c g
 Tachysphex mashona Arnold, 1929 i c g
 Tachysphex mauretanus Pulawski, 1971 i c g
 Tachysphex maurus Rohwer, 1911 i c g
 Tachysphex maximus Pulawski, 1977 i c g
 Tachysphex maya Pulawski, 1988 i c g
 Tachysphex mediterraneus Kohl, 1883 i c g
 Tachysphex melanius Pulawski, 2007 i c g
 Tachysphex melas Kohl, 1898 i c g
 Tachysphex mendozanus Brèthes, 1913 i c g
 Tachysphex menkei Pulawski, 1982 i c g
 Tachysphex merina Pulawski, 2007 i g
 Tachysphex mesembrius Pulawski, 2007 i c g
 Tachysphex micans (Radoszkowski, 1877) i c g
 Tachysphex miniatulus Arnold, 1924 i c g
 Tachysphex mirandus Pulawski, 1982 i c g
 Tachysphex miwok Pulawski, 1988 i c g
 Tachysphex mkomazi Pulawski, 2007 i c g
 Tachysphex mocsaryi Kohl, 1884 i c g
 Tachysphex moczari Tsuneki, 1972 i c g
 Tachysphex modestus Arnold, 1924 i c g
 Tachysphex montanus (Cresson, 1865) i c g
 Tachysphex montivagus Arnold, 1944 i c g
 Tachysphex morawitzi Pulawski, 1971 i c g
 Tachysphex morosus (F. Smith, 1858) i c g
 Tachysphex multifasciatus Pulawski in Evans, Matthews and Pulawski, 1976 i c g
 Tachysphex mundus W. Fox, 1894 i c g
 Tachysphex musciventris Pulawski, 1982 i c g
 Tachysphex mycerinus de Beaumont, 1940 i c g
 Tachysphex mzingeli Pulawski, 2007 i c g
 Tachysphex namaqua Pulawski, 2007 i c g
 Tachysphex naranhun Tsuneki, 1971 i c g
 Tachysphex nasalis F. Morawitz, 1893 i c g
 Tachysphex nefarius Pulawski, 1977 i c g
 Tachysphex nigerrimus (F. Smith, 1856) i c g
 Tachysphex nigricolor (Dalla Torre, 1897) i c g
 Tachysphex nigripennis (Spinola, 1808) g
 Tachysphex niloticus Pulawski, 1964 i c g
 Tachysphex nitidior de Beaumont, 1940 i c g
 Tachysphex nitidissimus de Beaumont, 1952 i c g
 Tachysphex nitidus (Spinola, 1805) i c g
 Tachysphex noar Pulawski in Krombein and Pulawski, 1994 i c g
 Tachysphex nobilis Straka, 2016 g
 Tachysphex nonakai Tsuneki, 1971 i c g
 Tachysphex notogoniaeformis Nadig, 1933 i c g
 Tachysphex novarae (de Saussure, 1867) i c g
 Tachysphex oasicola Pulawski, 1988 i c g
 Tachysphex oberon Arnold, 1923 i c g
 Tachysphex obscuripennis (Schenck, 1857) i c g
 Tachysphex obscurus Pulawski, 1971 i c g
 Tachysphex occidentalis Pulawski, 1982 i c g
 Tachysphex octodentatus Arnold, 1924 i c g
 Tachysphex omoi Guiglia, 1943 i c g
 Tachysphex onager Pulawski, 2007 i c g
 Tachysphex opacus F. Morawitz, 1893 i c g
 Tachysphex opata Pulawski, 1988 i c g
 Tachysphex orestes Pulawski, 1988 i c g
 Tachysphex osiris de Beaumont, 1940 i c g
 Tachysphex ovambo Pulawski, 2007 i c g
 Tachysphex oxychelus Pulawski in Krombein and Pulawski, 1994 i c g
 Tachysphex pacificus R. Turner, 1908 i c g
 Tachysphex paiute Pulawski, 1988 i c g
 Tachysphex palopterus (Dahlbom, 1845) i c g
 Tachysphex panzeri (Vander Linden, 1829) i c
 Tachysphex papago Pulawski, 1982 i c g
 Tachysphex paucispina Pulawski, 1977 i c g
 Tachysphex paulus Pulawski, 2007 i c g
 Tachysphex pauxillus W. Fox, 1894 i c g
 Tachysphex pechumani Krombein, 1938 i c g
 Tachysphex pectinatus Pulawski, 1974 i c g
 Tachysphex pekingensis Tsuneki, 1971 i c g
 Tachysphex pentheri Cameron, 1905 i c g
 Tachysphex perniger Arnold, 1947 i c g
 Tachysphex persa Gussakovskij, 1933 i c g
 Tachysphex persistans R. Turner, 1916 i c g
 Tachysphex peruanus Pulawski, 1986 i c g
 Tachysphex picnic van Ooijen in Hensen and van Ooijen, 1987 i c g
 Tachysphex pilosellus Pulawski, 1971 i c g
 Tachysphex pilosulus R. Turner, 1908 i c g
 Tachysphex pinal Pulawski, 1988 i c g
 Tachysphex pisonoides (Reed, 1894) i c g
 Tachysphex pisonopsis Pulawski, 1974 i c g
 Tachysphex platypus Pulawski, 1977 i c g
 Tachysphex platystethus Pulawski, 2007 i c g
 Tachysphex pleuralis Pulawski, 1977 i c g
 Tachysphex plicosus (A. Costa, 1867) i c g
 Tachysphex politus Pulawski, 1977 i c g
 Tachysphex pompiliformis (Panzer, 1804) i c g b
 Tachysphex powelli R. Bohart, 1962 i c g
 Tachysphex priesneri de Beaumont, 1940 i c g
 Tachysphex prismaticus Straka, 2005 i c g
 Tachysphex prosopigastroides Bischoff, 1913 i c g
 Tachysphex proteus Pulawski, 1977 i c g
 Tachysphex psammobius (Kohl, 1880) i c g
 Tachysphex pseudofasciatus Pulawski, 2007 i c g
 Tachysphex pseudopanzeri de Beaumont, 1955 i c g
 Tachysphex psilocerus Kohl, 1884 i c g
 Tachysphex psilonotus Pulawski, 2007 i c g
 Tachysphex ptah Pulawski, 1964 i c g
 Tachysphex pubescens Pulawski, 1977 i c g
 Tachysphex pugnator R. Turner, 1908 i c g
 Tachysphex pulcher Pulawski, 1967 i c g
 Tachysphex punctatiformis Arnold, 1923 i c g
 Tachysphex punctatus (F. Smith, 1856) i c g
 Tachysphex puncticeps Cameron, 1903 i c g
 Tachysphex punctifrons (W. Fox, 1891) i c g
 Tachysphex punctiger Pulawski, 2007 i c g
 Tachysphex punctipes Pulawski, 1967 i c g
 Tachysphex punctipleuris Straka, 2016 g
 Tachysphex pusulosus de Beaumont, 1955 i c g
 Tachysphex quadricolor (Gerstaecker in Peters, 1858) i c g
 Tachysphex quisqueyus Pulawski, 1988 i c g
 Tachysphex radiatus Gussakovskij, 1952 i c g
 Tachysphex radoszkowskyi F. Morawitz, 1893 i c g
 Tachysphex ramses Pulawski, 1971 i c g
 Tachysphex rapax Pulawski, 2007 i c g
 Tachysphex reedi Menke in Pulawski, 1974 i c g
 Tachysphex remotus Pulawski, 1974 i c g
 Tachysphex rhacodes Pulawski, 2007 i c g
 Tachysphex rhodesianus Bischoff, 1913 i c g
 Tachysphex rhynchocephalus Pulawski, 1977 i c g
 Tachysphex robustior F. Williams, 1914 i c g
 Tachysphex rotundus Pulawski, 2007 i c g
 Tachysphex ruber Pulawski, 2007 i c g
 Tachysphex rubicundus Pulawski, 1971 i c g
 Tachysphex ruficaudis (Taschenberg, 1870) i c g
 Tachysphex rufitarsis (Spinola, 1851) i c g
 Tachysphex rufopictus Arnold, 1929 i c g
 Tachysphex rugicauda Pulawski in Krombein and Pulawski, 1994 i c g
 Tachysphex rugosipleuris Pulawski, 2007 i c g
 Tachysphex sabulosus Pulawski, 2007 i c g
 Tachysphex saevus Arnold, 1924 i c g
 Tachysphex sahelensis Pulawski, 2007 i c g
 Tachysphex samburu Pulawski, 2007 i c g
 Tachysphex saturnus Arnold, 1924 i c g
 Tachysphex saundersi Mercet, 1909 i c g
 Tachysphex scaber Pulawski, 2007 i c g
 Tachysphex scaurus Arnold, 1945 i c g
 Tachysphex schmiedeknechti Kohl, 1883 i c g
 Tachysphex schoenlandi Cameron, 1905 i c g
 Tachysphex scopa Pulawski, 2007 i c g
 Tachysphex scopaeus Pulawski, 1988 i c g
 Tachysphex semirufus (Cresson, 1865) i c g
 Tachysphex sericans Gussakovskij, 1952 i c g
 Tachysphex sericeus (F. Smith, 1856) i c g
 Tachysphex sexinus Leclercq, 1961 i c g
 Tachysphex seyrigi Arnold, 1945 i c g
 Tachysphex siitanus Tsuneki, 1971 i c g
 Tachysphex silvestris Pulawski, 2007 i c g
 Tachysphex similis Rohwer, 1910 i c g b
 Tachysphex smissenae Straka, 2016 g
 Tachysphex socotrae Pulawski, 2007 i c g
 Tachysphex solaris Pulawski, 1982 i c g
 Tachysphex sonorensis (Cameron, 1889) i c g
 Tachysphex sordidus (Dahlbom, 1845) i c g
 Tachysphex spatulifer Pulawski, 1982 i c g
 Tachysphex speciosissimus Morice, 1897 i c g
 Tachysphex spectrum Pulawski, 2007 i c g
 Tachysphex spinulosus Pulawski, 1975 i c g
 Tachysphex splendidulus F. Morawitz, 1893 i c g
 Tachysphex spretus Kohl, 1901 i c g
 Tachysphex sri Pulawski in Krombein and Pulawski, 1994 i c g
 Tachysphex stachi de Beaumont, 1936 i c g
 Tachysphex stevensoni Arnold, 1924 i c g
 Tachysphex stimulator R. Turner, 1916 i c g
 Tachysphex stysi Straka, 2008 i c g
 Tachysphex suavis Arnold, 1929 i c g
 Tachysphex subandinus Pulawski, 1974 i c g
 Tachysphex subcoriaceus Arnold, 1945 i c g
 Tachysphex subdentatus F. Morawitz, 1893 i c g
 Tachysphex subfimbriatus Arnold, 1924 i c g
 Tachysphex subopacus R. Turner, 1910 i c g
 Tachysphex sulcatus Pulawski, 1988 i c g
 Tachysphex sulcidorsum de Beaumont, 1950 i c g
 Tachysphex svetlanae Pulawski, 1971 i c g
 Tachysphex sycorax Arnold, 1923 i c g
 Tachysphex sympleuron Pulawski in Krombein and Pulawski, 1994 i c g
 Tachysphex tahoe Pulawski, 1988 i c g
 Tachysphex taita Pulawski, 2007 i c g
 Tachysphex tanqua Pulawski, 2007 i c g
 Tachysphex tarsatus (Say, 1823) i c g
 Tachysphex tarsinus (Lepeletier de Saint Fargeau, 1845) i c g
 Tachysphex tembe Pulawski, 2007 i c g
 Tachysphex tenuicornis Bischoff, 1913 i c g
 Tachysphex tenuis R. Turner, 1908 i c g
 Tachysphex tenuisculptus Pulawski, 1977 i c g
 Tachysphex terminatus (F. Smith, 1856) i c g
 Tachysphex tessellatus (Dahlbom, 1845) i c g
 Tachysphex testaceipes Bingham, 1897 i c g
 Tachysphex texanus (Cresson, 1873) i c g
 Tachysphex theseus Arnold, 1951 i c g
 Tachysphex thysanomerus Pulawski, 2007 i c g
 Tachysphex tipai Pulawski, 1988 i c g
 Tachysphex titania Arnold, 1923 i c g
 Tachysphex toltec Pulawski, 1988 i c g
 Tachysphex truncatifrons R. Turner, 1908 i c g
 Tachysphex tryssus Pulawski, 2007 i c g
 Tachysphex tsil Pulawski, 1988 i c g
 Tachysphex ulonyovu Pulawski, 2007 i c g
 Tachysphex ulothrix Pulawski, 2007 i c g
 Tachysphex undatus (F. Smith, 1856) i c g
 Tachysphex unicolor (Panzer, 1807) i c g
 Tachysphex usakos Pulawski, 2007 i c g
 Tachysphex utina Pulawski, 1988 i c g
 Tachysphex vanrhynsi Arnold, 1940 i c g
 Tachysphex vardyi Pulawski, 1977 i c g
 Tachysphex venator Arnold, 1960 i c g
 Tachysphex verticalis Pulawski, 1982 i c g
 Tachysphex vestitus Kohl, 1892 i c g
 Tachysphex vitiensis F. Williams, 1928 i c g
 Tachysphex vividus Pulawski, 1977 i c g
 Tachysphex vulneratus R. Turner, 1917 i c g
 Tachysphex walkeri R. Turner, 1908 i c g
 Tachysphex waltoni Arnold, 1940 i c g
 Tachysphex williamsi R. Bohart, 1962 i c g
 Tachysphex xanthoptesimus Pulawski in Krombein and Pulawski, 1994 i c g
 Tachysphex yarrowi de Beaumont, 1960 i c g
 Tachysphex yolo Pulawski, 1982 i c g
 Tachysphex yuma Pulawski, 1982 i c g
 Tachysphex zambius Pulawski, 2007 i c g
 Tachysphex ziziphi Pulawski, 2007 i c g

Data sources: i = ITIS, c = Catalogue of Life, g = GBIF, b = Bugguide.net

References

Tachysphex